Cheppy is a commune in the Meuse department in Grand Est in northeastern France.

It was a site of fighting during World War I. An American monument sculpted by Nancy Coonsman was erected there by the State of Missouri after the war to honor the volunteers of the state.

See also
Communes of the Meuse department

References

Communes of Meuse (department)